The smoky robin (Peneothello cryptoleuca) is a species of bird in the family Petroicidae endemic to West Papua, Indonesia. Its natural habitat is subtropical or tropical moist montane forests.

Described by German ornithologist, Ernst Hartert, in 1874, the smoky robin is a member of the Australian robin family Petroicidae. Sibley and Ahlquist's DNA-DNA hybridisation studies placed this group in a Corvida parvorder comprising many tropical and Australian passerines, including pardalotes, fairy-wrens, and honeyeaters, as well as crows. However, subsequent molecular research (and current consensus) places the robins as a very early offshoot of the Passerida, or "advanced" songbirds, within the songbird lineage.

References

smoky robin
Birds of Western New Guinea
smoky robin
Taxonomy articles created by Polbot